Rajasthan Royals (RR) is a franchise cricket team based in Jaipur, India, which plays in the Indian Premier League (IPL). They were one of the eight teams that competed in the 2008 Indian Premier League. They were captained by Shane Warne. Rajasthan Royals finished winners in the IPL and qualified for the Champions League T20.

Indian Premier League

Standings
Rajasthan Royals finished first in the league stage of IPL 2008.

Match log

References

Rajasthan Royals seasons
2008 Indian Premier League